KPMB is a Canadian architecture firm founded by Bruce Kuwabara, Thomas Payne, Marianne McKenna, and Shirley Blumberg, in 1987. It is headquartered in Toronto, where the majority of their work is found. Aside from designing buildings, the firm also works in interior design. KPMB Architects was officially renamed from Kuwabara Payne McKenna Blumberg Architects to KPMB Architects on February 12, 2013.

Firm history
KPMB Architects’ four founding partners were former associates of Barton Myers Associates, until Myers permanently relocated his practice to his Los Angeles office. Kuwabara, Payne, McKenna and Blumberg stayed in Toronto and formed their own studio. Thomas Payne left the firm to start a multidisciplinary architectural studio in 2013.

Early works
KPMB's early projects were completed in association with Barton Myers, including Woodsworth College at the University of Toronto (1991) and the Art Gallery of Ontario Stage III Expansion (1992). Early on in the practice, KPMB won two major competitions: Kitchener City Hall and the Joseph S. Stauffer Library, the new central library for Queen's University in Kingston, ON.

KPMB and Toronto
Many of KPMB's projects are found in their home town of Toronto. Early projects involved retrofits and infill projects juxtaposed with existing structures, including King James Place (1991) on Toronto's King Street East and the Design Exchange (1994), a retrofit of Toronto's former Stock Exchange building into an exhibition space for design.

In the 21st century KPMB completed a number of cultural facilities that contribute to what is known as the "Toronto Cultural Renaissance": Roy Thomson Hall Enhancement (2002) home of the Toronto Symphony Orchestra, Canada's National Ballet School (2005) with Goldsmith Borgal Architects, the Gardiner Museum  (2006), Young Centre for the Performing Arts (2006), TELUS Centre for Performance and Learning at the Royal Conservatory (2009), and the TIFF Bell Lightbox (2010) a permanent home for the Toronto International Film Festival.

Work outside of Toronto and Canada
KPMB has a diverse portfolio of work across Canada, the United States and Europe.

Canadian projects include Le Quartier Concordia at Concordia University, the Remai Modern public art museum in Saskatchewan, and the LEED Platinum Headquarters Manitoba Hydro Place in Winnipeg, which some consider North America's most complex energy-efficient buildings in one of its most challenging climates. In 2022, KPMB Architects was named as the lead designer for the United Church of Canada's Kindred Works project, to transform underutilized United Church properties, including Toronto's St. Luke's United Church, into multi-unit residential buildings housing 34,000 people over 15 years.

American projects include the Walgreen Drama Center for the University of Michigan, Sprague Memorial Hall for Yale University and the Goodman Theatre in Chicago. KPMB's current work includes projects for Princeton University, Orchestra Hall for the Minnesota Orchestra in Minneapolis and the Kellogg School of Management at Northwestern University.

Major projects

Canada
 Kitchener City Hall, Kitchener, Ontario, 1993 
 Design Exchange, Toronto, Ontario, 1994 
 Royal Conservatory, Ettore Mazzoleni Hall, Toronto, Ontario, 1997 
 Stratford Festival Theatre Renewal, Stratford, Ontario, 1993 
 McKee Public School, North York, Ontario, 1998
 Richmond City Hall, Richmond, British Columbia, 2000
 Jackson-Triggs Niagara Estate Winery, Niagara-on-the-Lake, Ontario, 2001 
 Ravine House, Toronto, Ontario, 2002
 Roy Thomson Hall, Enhancement, Toronto, Ontario, 2002
St. Andrew's College, Aurora, Ontario, 2003
 McGill University and Génome Québec Innovation Centre, Montreal, Quebec, 2003
 James Stewart Centre for Mathematics, McMaster University, Hamilton, Ontario, 2003
 Centennial College Applied Research and Innovation Centre, Toronto, Ontario, 2004
 Art Gallery of Hamilton, Hamilton, Ontario, 2005
 Canada's National Ballet School, Project Grand Jeté, Toronto, Ontario, 2005
 Le Quartier Concordia University, Engineering, Computer Science and Visual Arts, Montreal, Quebec, 2005
 Woodbridge Offices, Toronto, Ontario, 2005
 180 Queen Street West, Toronto, Ontario, 2006 
 Young Centre for the Performing Arts, Toronto, Ontario, 2006
 Gardiner Museum, Toronto, Ontario, 2006
 Ryerson University (now Toronto Metropolitan University) Master Plan, Toronto, Ontario, 2007 
 CTV Television Network Executive Offices, Toronto, Ontario, 2008 
 Nota Bene Restaurant, Toronto, Ontario, 2008
 Torys LLP, Toronto, Ontario, 2008 
 One Bedford Residential Development, Toronto, Ontario, 2009 
 Branksome Hall Master Plan Update, Toronto, Ontario, 2009
 Block 24 E, Railway Lands West – Neo & Montage Condominiums, Toronto, Ontario, 2009
 Manitoba Hydro Place, Winnipeg, Manitoba, 2009
 Royal Conservatory TELUS Centre for Performance and Learning, Toronto, Ontario, 2009
 Le Quartier Concordia University, John Molson School of Business, Montreal, Quebec, 2009
 Canadian Museum of Nature, Ottawa, Ontario, 2010
 TIFF Bell Lightbox, Toronto, Ontario, 2010
 Rosedale Clubhouse, Enhancement Feasibility Study, Toronto, Ontario, 2010
 Le Quartier Concordia University, Guy-Métro Building Recladding, Montreal, Quebec, 2011
 Maple Leaf Square, Bremner Blvd, Toronto, Ontario, 2011
 The Power Plant Gallery, Refresh, Toronto, Ontario, 2011 
 Gluskin Sheff & Asscoaites, Toronto, Ontario, 2011 
 Vaughan City Hall, Vaughan, Ontario, 2011
 Centre for International Governance Innovation Campus, Waterloo, Ontario, 2011
 Southcore Financial Centre, PricewaterhouseCoopers Tower, Toronto, Ontario, 2011
 Torys LLP, Calgary, Alberta, 2012 
 Roy Thomson Hall, Wine Bar, Toronto, Ontario, 2012
 150 Dan Leckie Way, Toronto Community Housing Corporation, Toronto, Ontario, 2012 
 George Brown College, Daphne Cockwell Centre for Health Sciences, Toronto, Ontario, 2012
 Mike & Ophelia Lazaridis Quantum-Nano Centre, University of Waterloo, Waterloo, Ontario, 2012
 The Joseph L. Rotman School of Management Expansion, University of Toronto, Toronto, Ontario, 2012
 Munk School of Global Affairs, University of Toronto, Toronto, Ontario, 2012 
 Elementary Teachers' Federation of Ontario, Toronto, Ontario, 2013 
 Sugino Studio, Toronto, Ontario, 2013 
 Bridgepoint Health, Toronto, Ontario, 2013
 Ponderosa Commons, University of British Columbia, Vancouver, British Columbia, (Phase 1), 2013
 Fort York Branch Library, Toronto, Ontario, 2014 
 Library District Condominiums, Toronto, Ontario, 2014 
 Southcore Financial Centre, Bremner Tower, Toronto, Ontario, 2015  
 Torys LLP, Montreal, Quebec, 2015 
 2015 Pan American Games/Parapan American Games Athletes’ Village | Canary District, Toronto, Ontario, 2015  
 Robert H. Lee Alumni Centre, University of British Columbia, Vancouver, British Columbia, 2015 
 St. Michael's Cathedral, Block Master Plan, Toronto, Ontario, 2015
 Bay Adelaide East Tower and Podium, Toronto, Ontario, 2016 
 Ponderosa Commons, University of British Columbia, Vancouver, British Columbia, (Phase 2), 2016 
 Thornwood House, Toronto, Ontario, 2016
 The Globe and Mail Office Interiors and Corporate Event Space, Toronto, Ontario, 2017
 Global Centre for Pluralism, Ottawa, Ontario, 2017 
 Remai Modern Art Gallery of Saskatchewan, Saskatoon, Saskatchewan, 2017 
 Ottawa Art Gallery (OAG) Expansion and Arts Court Redevelopment, Ottawa, Ontario, 2018 	
 Wilson School of Design, Kwantlen Polytechnic University, Richmond, British Columbia, 2018
 Lloyd Hall, Banff Centre for Art and Creativity, Banff, Alberta, 2018  
 Lawrence Hights, Toronto, Ontario, 2018 
 11 Wellesley, Toronto, Ontario, 2018 
 Canada's Diversity Gardens at Assiniboine Park, Winnipeg, Manitoba, 2019 
 University of Lethbridge Destination Project, Lethbridge, Alberta, 2019
 11 Wellesley, Toronto, Ontario, 2019
 Bloor Street United Church: 300 Bloor West, Toronto, Ontario, 2020
 Massey Hall, Renovation and Expansion, Toronto, Ontario, 2020
 University of Toronto, Landscape of Landmark Quality, Toronto, Ontario, 2020
 Jack Layton Ferry Terminal and Harbour Square Park, Toronto, Ontario, Ongoing
 St. Luke's United Church, Toronto, Ontario, ongoing

United States
 Ammirati Puris Lintas, New York City, 1997
 Goodman Theatre, Chicago, Illinois, 2000
 Sprague Memorial Hall, Yale University, New Haven, Connecticut, 2003
 Charles R. Walgreen Jr. Drama Center & Arthur Miller Theatre, Ann Arbor, Michigan, 2007
 The Study at Yale Hotel, New Haven, Connecticut, 2008
 SugarCube, Denver, Colorado, 2008
 Conrad Hotels, New York City, New York (state), 2012 
 Orchestra Hall Renewal, Minnesota Orchestra, Minneapolis, Minnesota, 2013
 Adams Center for Musical Arts, Yale University, New Haven, Connecticut, 2015
 Julis Romo Rabinowitz Building & Louis A. Simpson International Building, Princeton University, Princeton, New Jersey, 2017 
 Kellogg School of Management, Northwestern University, Evanston, Illinois, 2017 
 Ronald O. Perelman Center for Political Science and Economics, University of Pennsylvania, Philadelphia, Pennsylvania, 2018

International
 Star Alliance Lounge, Zürich, Switzerland, 2001 
 Canadian Embassy Berlin, Berlin, Germany, 2005

See also
 Bruce Kuwabara
 Marianne McKenna
 Shirley Blumberg

References

External links

Architecture firms of Canada
Companies based in Toronto